The following highways are numbered 677:

Philippines
 N677 highway (Philippines)

United States